Concina . Notable people with the surname include:
Barbie Concina (born 1998), Filipina actress
Daniello Concina (1687–1756), Italian Dominican preacher, controversialist and theologian
Enzo Concina (born 1962), Canadian soccer player
Leandro Concina (born 1984), Argentinean volleyball player
Roberto Concina (1969–2017), Swiss-born Italian record producer, composer, musician and DJ known as Robert Miles

Italian-language surnames